Unveiled may refer to:
Fremde Haut, a German film released in 2005 and distributed in the U.S. under the title Unveiled
"Unveiled", an episode of the television series Alias
Unveiled (Whitecross album)
Unveiled (Cage album)
Unveiled, a 1994 film starring Lisa Zane
Unveiled, 2019 book by Yasmine Mohammed